Padil is a locality in Mangalore city of Karnataka state in India. The Mangalore Junction railway station is situated in this locality.

Proposed DC office is situated in Padil. It is just 2 km from pumpwell and 2.5 km from Lotus mall.

References 

Localities in Mangalore